Rhinoclavis vertagus, common name the common creeper, is a species of sea snail, a marine gastropod mollusk in the family Cerithiidae, the ceriths. R.vertagus is most commonly found in intertidal sand flats

Description
R. vertagus has a cone shaped shell most commonly bearing white, grey and brown colors.The length of the shell varies between 40 mm and 80 mm.

Distribution 
This species occurs in Australia, Philippines, and in the Indo-west Pacific from east Africa to Vanuatu as a whole.

References

 Linnaeus, C. 1767. Systema naturae, per regna tria naturae, secundum classes, ordines, genera, species, cum caracteribus, differentiis, synonymis, locis. Holmiae [= Stockholm] : L. Salvii Vol. 1(2) 12, pp. 533–1327.
 Humphrey, G. 1797. Museum Calonnianum : specification of the various articles which compose the magnificent museum of natural history collected by M. de Calonne in France and lately his property : consisting of an assemblage of the most beautiful and rare subjects in entomology, conchology, ornithology, mineralogy, &c. London : E. Bibl. Radcl. viii, 84 pp.
 Röding, P.F. 1798. Museum Boltenianum sive Catalogus cimeliorum e tribus regnis naturae quae olim collegerat Joa. Hamburg : Trappii 199 pp.
 Perry, G. 1811. Conchology, or the natural history of shells containing a new arrangement of the genera and species, illustrated by coloured engravings, executed from the natural specimens and including the latest discoveries. London : W. Miller 4 pp., 62 pls.
 Schumacher, C.F. 1817. Essai d'un Nouveau Systéme des Habitations des vers Testacés. Copenhagen : Schultz 287 pp., pls 1-22.
 Tryon, G.W. (ed.) 1887. Solariidae, Ianthinidae, Trichotropidae, Scalariidae, Cerithiidae, Rissoidae, Littorinidae. Manual of Conchology. Philadelphia : G.W. Tryon Vol. 9 488 pp., 71 pls.
 Schepman, M.M. 1909. The Prosobranchia of the Siboga Expedition. Part 2. Taenioglossa and Ptenoglossa. 109-231, pls 10-16 in Weber, M. (ed.). Siboga Expeditie. Leiden : Brill Vol. 49.
 Dautzenberg, P. 1923. Liste Préliminaire des Mollusques marins de Madagascar et description de deux epèces nouvelles. Journal de Conchyliologie 68(1): 21-74
 Thiele, J. 1931. Handbuch der Systematischen Weichtierkunde. Jena : Gustav Fischer Vol. 2 pp. 377–778.
 Cotton, B.C. 1952. Family Cerithiidae. Royal Society of South Australia Malacological Section 2: 4 pp.
 Houbrick, R.S. 1978. The family Cerithiidae in the Indo-Pacific. Part I. The genera Rhinoclavis, Pseudovertagus and Clavocerithium. Monographs of Marine Mollusca 1: 1-130
 Abbott, R.T. & S.P. Dance (1986). Compendium of sea shells. American Malacologists, Inc:Melbourne, Florida
 Wilson, B. 1993. Australian Marine Shells. Prosobranch Gastropods. Kallaroo, Western Australia : Odyssey Publishing Vol. 1 408 pp.

External links 
 http://www.marinespecies.org/aphia.php?p=taxdetails&id=473152
 

Cerithiidae
Gastropods described in 1767
Taxa named by Carl Linnaeus